John Forbes (1 September 1950 – 23 January 1998) was an Australian poet.

Forbes was born in Melbourne, but during his childhood his family lived in northern Queensland, Malaya and New Guinea. He went to Sydney University, and his circle of friends included the poets Robert Adamson, Martin Johnston, and John Tranter. It was at this time that the work of the American poets Ted Berrigan, John Ashbery and Frank O'Hara made a strong and lasting impression on him.

He returned to live in Melbourne in the late 1980s, where he became the poetry editor of Scripsi. His friends around this time included the poets Gig Ryan, Laurie Duggan and Alan Wearne.

Forbes died in Melbourne of a heart attack, aged 47.

Works
Collected Poems, 1970–1998; 2001, Brandl & Schlesinger, .
Damaged Glamour; 1998, Brandl & Schlesinger, .
Humidity; 1998, Equipage.
New and Selected Poems; 1992, Angus & Robertson, .
The Stunned Mullet; 1988, Hale & Iremonger.
Stalin's Holidays; 1981, Transit Poetry.
Drugs; 1979, Black Lamb Press.
On the Beach; 1977, Sea Cruise Books. 
Tropical Skiing; 1976, Angus & Robertson.

Related works
Ken Bolton (ed.) Homage to John Forbes. (Brandl & Schlesinger, 2002)

References

External links
Poems, links etc., including obituary by Alan Wearne
Forbes issue of Jacket
Essay on Forbes by Philip Mead

1950 births
1998 deaths
Poets from Melbourne
University of Sydney alumni
20th-century Australian poets
Australian male poets
20th-century Australian male writers